Schweinfurt Hauptbahnhof is the largest railway station in the Lower Franconian city of Schweinfurt and its transfer hub to the majority of regional buses. In addition to the Hauptbahnhof, the Schweinfurt Mitte (Schweinfurt Central) and Schweinfurt Stadt (Schweinfurt Town) stations also lie within the city, closer to the centre, on the Bamberg–Würzburg railway.

Importance 
The station is no longer served by long-distance traffic since the introduction of the Interregio line from Stuttgart via Würzburg and Schweinfurt to Erfurt in 2001. It still has an important role, however, in regional and local rail services.

There are currently passenger services on the following lines:
 KBS 803 (Schweinfurt–) Bad Kissingen–Gemünden (Main) (Franconian Saale Valley Railway), single-tracked main line
 KBS 810 Würzburg–Schweinfurt–Haßfurt–Bamberg (Bamberg–Würzburg railway), double-tracked main line
 KBS 815/570 Schweinfurt–Bad Neustadt (Saale)–Meiningen /–Erfurt (Schweinfurt–Meiningen railway), single-tracked main line

On the single-tracked branch line Kitzingen–Schweinfurt there is still goods traffic between Gochsheim and Schweinfurt, the rest of the line to Kitzingen-Etwashausen is unused.

Links to regional and local services 
Schweinfurt Hauptbahnhof is embedded in the Deutsche Bahn network as shown below (as at: 2006/2007 timetable):

Schweinfurt Hbf is a timetable hub (Taktknoten), i.e. every hour on the hour trains arrive on the three main lines and depart shortly after the hour again. Included in this system are the three Regional-Express links and the trains of EIB Line 4. There is an hourly service to Würzburg and Bamberg which is achieved by overlapping the two RE lines, and on the routes to Bad Kissingen and Meiningen/Erfurt there is also an hourly service which alternates between RE and EIB trains. On the Würzburg–Bamberg route the frequency of RE trains is supplemented by the use of RegionalBahn services; likewise the EIB Linie 5 Schweinfurt–Gemünden (Main), bolsters the section to Bad Kissingen.

Infrastructure

Station building 
The station building at Schweinfurt Hauptbahnhof is on the north side of the tracks. After the original building had been destroyed by bomb attacks in the Second World War, a modern, functional building was erected after the war in the style of the 1950s. The two-storey building houses a Deutsche Bahn travel centre (ReiseZentrum), toilets, lockers and several shops.

Traffic station 
The station has five through platforms for passengers. Two bay platforms directly in front of the station building are no longer needed for scheduled services since trains from Bad Kissingen and Meiningen now pass through the Hauptbahnhof and stop at the more centrally-sited Schweinfurt Stadt station. All platforms have a height of 38 cm and are accessed by flights of stairs from an underpass.

References

External links

Station fact file in the data bank of the Bavarian Railway Company (Bayerischen Eisenbahngesellschaft)
Station fact file in the Deutsche Bahn data
Departure timetable on the Deutsche Bahn website

Railway stations in Bavaria
Hauptbahnhof